(The) Grand Ridge Road is a long tourist drive through Gippsland, in Victoria, Australia. As the name suggests, the road primarily follows ridgelines through the heavily undulating Strzelecki Ranges.

The road is known for the attractive scenery ranging from open farmland to dense forest, especially as it passes through Mount Worth State Park and Tarra Bulga National Park. Its surface ranges from good quality sealed bitumen to heavily corrugated unsealed gravel.

Route
Grand Ridge Road begins at the intersection Korumburra-Warragul Road in Seaview and runs in an easterly direction as a narrow dual-lane, single-carriageway sealed road via Allembee South to eventually meet the Strzelecki Highway at Mirboo North, where the road quality improves as a dual-lane single-carriageway rural highway. It continues east as a narrow sealed road just beyond Mirboo, where the road quality degrades further into a single-lane dirt and gravel mountain road as it winds through the eastern Strzelecki Ranges; many sections are quite steep and passing opportunities are usually possible only at road junctions. The road quality improves to a narrow dual-lane sealed road where it meets Tarra Valley Road, and continues east as a sealed road until its eastern terminus at the intersection with Hyland Highway in Willing South.

The unsealed section of the road is heavily used by logging trucks throughout the year. Large trees and branches often fall after high winds. This road is not recommended for caravans.

History
The construction of (The) Ridge Road was detailed in the Country Roads Board's annual review for the 1924/25 financial year, running from Seaview, Mirboo, Gunyah, Ryton, through Balook, Blackwarry to Carrajung (for a total of 66 miles), described to "play an important part in the further development of the hill country of South Gippsland"; it was referred to as the Grand Ridge Road from 1933.

A section of the road between Wonyip and Albert River was later declared as part of Midland Highway in 1939; this was later incorporated back into the Grand Ridge Road when highway status was revoked in 1990.

The Grand Ridge Road was signed as State Route 190 between Wonyip and Albert River (as part of the Midland Highway) in 1986; despite the revocation of the highway in 1990, this section was still signed as such until the change-over to the new alphanumeric system in the late 1990s, when all traces of the former route were removed. It is today signed as Tourist Route 93 for its entire route; its eastern section between Balook and Willung South is also signed Tourist Route 94 as part of the eastern loop of the Strzelecki Trail.

The passing of the Road Management Act 2004 granted the responsibility of overall management and development of Victoria's major arterial roads to VicRoads: in 2004, VicRoads re-declared the road as The Grand Ridge Road (Arterial #4023) between Tarra Valley Road in Balook and Hyland Highway at Willung South; the remaining section of Grand Ridge Road between Seaview and Balook remains undeclared.

Significant intersections

Notes

Sources
http://206gti.net/grr/
http://gippsland.com/Directory/Trails/GrandRidgeRoad.asp

Gippsland (region)
Roads in Victoria (Australia)